The Prestige International Aranmare Akita are a women's basketball team based in Akita, Akita that will play in the Women's Japan Basketball League. Aranmare also has a volleyball team in Sakata, Shonai, and a handball team in Imizu, Toyama.

Current roster

Notable players
 Hitomi Kawase (zh-yue)
 Chihiro Sato (zh-yue)
 Natsuki Sunagawa (zh-yue)
 Fuka Tanabe (zh-yue)
 Yoko Tanaka (zh-yue)

Coaches
Saori Kamihigoshi
Soshi Yasuda
 Sun Jieping
 Koki Sagara
 Hirofumi Kojima
 Asami Tanaka
 Ken Takahashi

Practice facilities

 Prestige International Akita Gymnasium
Iwaki General Gymnasium
Matsugasaki Gymnasium
Akita Municipal Seibu Gymnasium
Akita University of Art Gymnasium

Former players
Chen Ying
Manami Dehara
Arisa Echigoya
Sayaka Fukuda
Megumi Fujimori
Takumi Fujiwara
Yoka Hanada
Yuno Hiyama
Yuna Horita
Yume Ito
Misako Iwasaki
Kasumi Kakinuma
Mai Kobayashi
An Komasawa
Mana Muraki
Saki Nagata
Ayumi Narita
Yo Nishimura
Yumi Osato
Nanami Sawada
Yutsuki Takahashi
Fuka Tanabe
Yuka Toki 
Midori Tsujimoto
Momola Udo
Qiu Yu-Bao
Zhang Qi-Fang

Venues
Akita Prefectural Gymnasium
Akita Prefectural Training Center Arena
Barajima Gymnasium
CNA Arena Akita
Gojome Gymnasium
Kazuno Memorial Sports Center
Kazuno Training Center Alpas
Masuda Gymnasium
Misato General Gymnasium Lirios
Nices Arena
Omonogawa Gymnasium
Sun Sportsland Kyowa Gymnasium
Sun Village Nakasen Gymnasium
Ugo General Gymnasium
Yamamoto Gymnasium
Yokote Gymnasium
Yuzawa Shohoku High School Gymnasium

See also
Akita Bank Red Arrows
Prestige International Aranmare Yamagata

References

External links

2015 establishments in Japan
Basketball teams in Japan
Basketball teams established in 2015
Sport in Akita (city)
Sports teams in Akita Prefecture